The Emilia-Romagna regional election of 1995 took place on 23 April 1995.

Pier Luigi Bersani (Democratic Party of the Left), who had succeeded Enrico Boselli (Socialist Party) in 1994, was elected President of the Region, defeating Gianfranco Morra (Forza Italia) by a landslide.

For the first time the President of the Region was directly elected by the people, although the election was not yet binding and the President-elect could have been replaced during the term. This is precisely what happened in 1996, when Antonio La Forgia replaced Bersani, who had been appointed minister in Prodi I Cabinet, and again in 1999, when La Forgia was replaced by Vasco Errani.

Electoral system
The Legislative Assembly of Emilia-Romagna (Assemblea Legislativa dell'Emilia-Romagna) is composed of 50 members. 40 councillors are elected in provincial constituencies by proportional representation using the largest remainder method with a Droop quota and open lists, while 10 councillors (elected in bloc) come from a "regional list", including the President-elect. One seat is reserved for the candidate who comes second. If a coalition wins more than 50% of the total seats in the Council with PR, only 5 candidates from the regional list will be chosen and the number of those elected in provincial constituencies will be 45. If the winning coalition receives less than 40% of votes special seats are added to the Council to ensure a large majority for the President's coalition.

Parties and candidates

Results

References

1995 elections in Italy
1995 regional election
April 1995 events in Europe
1995